= Sonoli =

- Village
- Interactive map of Sonoli
- Coordinates: 21°22′N 78°38′E
- Country: India
- State: Karnataka
- District: Belgaum
- Talukas: Belgaum

Languages
  - Official: Marathi, Kannada
- Time zone: UTC+5:30 (IST)

Sonoli is a village in Belgaum district of Karnataka, India.
